Brandon Robinson, known professionally as Brandon "Scoop B" Robinson, is an American television host, sportswriter, podcaster and executive producer who is currently an NBA Insider at Bally Sports Network. He's had prior stops as a radio host and sports columnist at CBS Sports Radio.

Early life and education 
He is an alum of Don Bosco Preparatory High School, where he was sports editor of the Ironman newspaper. He completed his Bachelor of Arts (BA) from Eastern University and graduated with a master's degree in journalism from Hofstra University. He was sports editor of Eastern's Waltonian newspaper and public address announcer of Eastern's soccer, volleyball, basketball and lacrosse teams.

Career 
Robinson began his career at the age of 12, co-hosting Nets Slammin' Planet on the now-defunct Radio AAHS (later AAHS World Radio).

Over the years, Robinson contributed as a writer to sports and entertainment magazines such as Regal Sports Radio's D & Davis Show,  Slam magazine, The Source, Billboard, CBS Local Sports, Respect., Vibe, Jet, Ebony. He's appeared regularly as a sports contributor on television and radio programming, including Sirius XM radio Arise News, Complex and ESPN.

After leaving The Source in 2015, he hosted  a sports show on CBS Radio called Brown and Scoop and also served as a sports columnist for the network.

Robinson became the Managing Editor & Columnist at Respect Magazine where his writing tackled the intersection of sports, entertainment, lifestyle and politics. In March 2018, he became a senior writer at Basketball Society. He also contributed to Heavy as a senior sports writer.

In May 2021, he joined Bally Sports Network as a National NBA Insider.

Robinson's interest in sports began in the 1990s while working in his family's shoe businesses, Men's Walker and The Athlete’s Foot, in Harlem, New York City.

References

External links 
 

Television personalities from Philadelphia
Don Bosco Preparatory High School alumni
American television reporters and correspondents
Sportspeople from Manhattan
Sportspeople from Essex County, New Jersey
People from Harlem
CBS Sports
CBS Radio
African-American culture
CBS Radio Sports
Music magazines published in the United States
Eastern University (United States)
New Jersey Nets announcers
The Lawrence Herbert School of Communication alumni
1985 births
Living people